Pieces in a Modern Style is the sixth album by electronic instrumentalist William Orbit.  He is credited as arranger, programmer, producer, and performer of the album. It was released in 2000 by WEA and Warner Music UK in Europe and Maverick Records in the United States. Barber's Adagio for Strings was the first single from the album; however, the version played on radio and television was a remix by Ferry Corsten. The album is a fusion of classical music, electronica, ambient music and chill out music and contains no vocals. The Adagio single reached #4 in the UK Singles Chart in December 1999.

The second single was Pavane pour une Infante Défunte. This again had a different arrangement to the album version, but this time was done by Orbit himself. The single reached #31 in the UK Singles Chart in May 2000.

The album was originally released in May 1995 on Orbit's N-Gram Recordings label, credited to Orbit alias The Electric Chamber. This version is not widely available, as it was withdrawn from sale almost immediately when Arvo Pärt objected to its inclusion of his compositions Fratres and Cantus In Memoriam Benjamin Britten. The version issued in 2000 replaced these pieces with works by Beethoven, Vivaldi, Handel and Mascagni, and reached #2 in the UK Album Charts.

A Deutsche Grammophon 2000 release Pieces In The Original Style: Bohemia (Catalogue number 463 450-2) featured the original versions of the tracks on this CD, which included contributions from Anne-Sophie Mutter, Yo-Yo Ma, Gidon Kremer and Mark Seltser; conductors included Leonard Bernstein, Giuseppe Sinopoli and Herbert von Karajan.

In 2010 a follow-up, entitled simply Pieces in a Modern Style 2, was released.

Track listing
 Samuel Barber - "Adagio for Strings"  – 9:34
 John Cage - "In a Landscape"  – 2:57
 Erik Satie - "Ogive Number 1"  – 6:44
 Pietro Mascagni - "Cavalleria Rusticana"  – 3:19
 Maurice Ravel - "Pavane pour une Infante Défunte"  – 6:11
 Antonio Vivaldi - "L'Inverno"  – 3:57
 Ludwig van Beethoven - "Triple Concerto"  – 5:32
 Georg Friedrich Händel - "Xerxes"  – 4:42
 Henryk Górecki - "Piece in the Old Style 1"  – 5:06
 Henryk Górecki - "Piece in the Old Style 3"  – 5:49
 Ludwig van Beethoven - "Opus 132"  – 6:14

Limited edition EP also contains:
"Adagio for Strings" (Ferry Corsten Mix) - 6:33
"Adagio for Strings" (ATB Mix) - 7:35

Charts

Weekly charts

Year-end charts

References

2000 albums
William Orbit albums
Albums produced by William Orbit